The 1854–55 United States Senate elections were held on various dates in various states. As these U.S. Senate elections were prior to the ratification of the Seventeenth Amendment in 1913, senators were chosen by state legislatures. Senators were elected over a wide range of time throughout 1854 and 1855, and a seat may have been filled months late or remained vacant due to legislative deadlock. In these elections, terms were up for the senators in Class 3.

These elections saw the final decline of the Whig Party and the maintained majority of the Democrats. Those Whigs in the South who were opposed to secession ran on the "Opposition Party" ticket, and were elected to a minority.  Along with the Whigs, the Senate roster also included Free Soilers, Know Nothings, and a new party: the Republicans. Only five of the twenty-one senators up for election were re-elected.

Results summary 
Senate party division, 34th Congress (1855-1857)

 Majority party: Democratic (35)
 Minority party: Opposition (20) (Whigs, Republicans, Know Nothings, Free Soilers)
 Vacant: 7
 Total seats: 62

Change in Senate composition

Before the elections 
After the October 14, 1854 special election in Vermont.

As a result of the elections

Beginning of the next Congress

Beginning of the first session, December 3, 1855

Race summaries

Special elections during the 33rd Congress 
In these special elections, the winners were seated during 1854 or in 1855 before March 4; ordered by election date.

Elections leading to the 34th Congress 
In these general elections, the winners were elected for the term beginning March 4, 1855; ordered by state.

All of the elections involved the Class 3 seats.

Elections during the 34th Congress 
In these elections, the winners were elected in 1855 after March 4.

Kentucky 

On January 10, 1854 the Kentucky legislature elected Whig U.S. Attorney General (and former-senator and former-Governor of Kentucky) John J. Crittenden to succeed Dixon, beating the then-incumbent Governor of Kentucky, Lazarus W. Powell.

Maryland 

James Pearce won re-election by an unknown margin of votes, for the Class 3 seat.

New York 

The election was held on February 6, 1855.  William H. Seward had been elected in 1849 to this seat and his term would expire on March 3, 1855. At the time the Democratic Party was split into two opposing factions: the "Hards" and the "Softs". After most of the "Barnburners" had left the party, joining the Whigs, the majority of "Hunkers" split over the question of reconciliation with the minority of Barnburners who had remained Democrats. The Hard faction (led by Daniel S. Dickinson) was against it, in true Hunker fashion claiming all patronage for themselves; the Soft faction (led by William L. Marcy, which included the former Barnburners, advocated party unity as a necessity to defeat the Whigs.

In 1854, the Republican Party was founded as a national party, but in New York the Whigs and the Anti-Nebraska Party ran concurrently at the State election. The unification of these occurred in New York only during the nomination convention for the State election in November 1855. Also running in the 1854 election were the American Party and nominees of the Temperance movement. In a general way, party lines were blurred until the re-alignment during the late 1850s after the disbanding of the American Party.

At the State election in November 1853, 23 Whigs, 7 Hards and 2 Softs were elected for a two-year term (1854-1855) in the State Senate. At the State election in November 1854, Whig State Senator Myron H. Clark was elected Governor of New York, and 82 Whigs, 26 Softs, 16 Hards and 3 Temperance men were elected for the session of 1855 to the New York State Assembly. "Know Nothings are sprinkled miscellaneously among Whigs, Hards and Softs; and exactly how many there are of these gentry in the Assembly Nobody Knows." The 78th New York State Legislature met from January 2 to April 14, 1855, at Albany, New York.

In the Assembly, Seward received 69 votes, given by 65 Whigs; 1 Democrat; 1 Temperance man; 1 Republican and 1 Whig-Republican. Dickinson received 14 votes, given by 13 Democrats and 1 American. Horatio Seymour received the votes of 12 Democrats. Dix received 7 votes, given by 5 Democrats; 1 Independent Democrat and 1 Temperance man. Fillmore received 4 votes, given by 2 Whigs; 1 Democrat and 1 Temperance-American. Horatio Seymour, Jr., received the votes of 2 Americans. King, Butler, Lester, Wait and Bronson received 1 Democratic vote each. Campbell received 1 Temperance-American vote. Howell received 1 American vote. Hoffman and Haven received 1 Whig vote each.

In the State Senate, Seward received 18 Whig votes, Dickinson 5 Hard votes, and Allen 2 Whig votes. Preston and Church received 1 Soft vote each. Hoffman, Babcock, Ullmann and Fillmore received 1 American vote each.

Seward was the choice of both the Assembly and the Senate, and was declared elected.

See also 
 1854 United States elections
 1854–55 United States House of Representatives elections
 33rd United States Congress
 34th United States Congress

Notes

References 
 Party Division in the Senate, 1789-Present, via Senate.gov
The New York Civil List compiled in 1858 (see: pg. 63 for U.S. Senators; pg. 137 for State Senators 1855; pg. 248ff for Members of Assembly 1855)
Members of the 34th United States Congress
STATE AFFAIRS; Election of a U.S. Senator for Six Years in NYT on February 7, 1855 

Result Senate: Journal of the Senate (78th Session) (1855; pg. 198)